Rissi Palmer is the self-titled debut album from country music singer Rissi Palmer, issued on 1720 Entertainment. It debuted at #56 on the Top Country Albums chart, in addition to peaking at #16 on the Top Heatseekers and #41 in the Indie charts. The album's two singles, "Country Girl" and "Hold on to Me", both charted on the Billboard Hot Country Songs charts.

Track listing
"Hold on to Me" (Shaye Smith, Ed Hill, Rissi Palmer) – 4:04
"Country Girl" (Sarah Majors, Palmer, Cory Rooney, Shannon Sanders, Dan Shea) – 3:46
"Anybody out There" (Lisa Drew, S. Smith) – 3:18
"Hurt Don't Know When to Quit" (Hill, Palmer, S. Smith) – 3:00
"Mr. Ooh La La" (Lisa Chamberlin, Dave Smith, Deanna Walker) – 3:10
"All This Woman Needs" (James Dean Hicks, Palmer) – 3:36
"Flowers on My Window Ledge" (S. Smith, Hill, Palmer) – 3:49
"Leavin' on Your Mind" (Webb Pierce, Wayne Walker) – 2:42
"Butterflies" (Majors, Palmer) – 4:16
"Sweet Contradictions" (Frank J. Myers, Palmer) – 3:31
"Love You Like a Woman" (Majors, Palmer) – 4:23
"I'm Not of the World" (Majors, Palmer, Shea) – 3:41

2008 re-release
The album was re-released on October 7, 2008 to include the album's third single, "No Air". The re-release also removes the album's first two singles.

"Anybody out There" (Drew, S. Smith) – 3:18
"Hurt Don't Know When to Quit" (Hill, Palmer, S. Smith) – 3:00
"Mr. Ooh La La" (Chamberlin, D. Smith, D. Walker) – 3:10
"All This Woman Needs" (James Dean Hicks, Palmer) – 3:36
"No Air" (James Fauntleroy II, Eric "Blue Tooth" Griggs, Michael Scala, Harvey Mason, Jr., Damon Thomas, Steve Russell) – 3:50
"Flowers on My Window Ledge" (S. Smith, Hill, Palmer) – 3:49
"Leavin' on Your Mind" (Pierce, W. Walker) – 2:42
"Butterflies" (Majors, Palmer) – 4:16
"Sweet Contradictions" (Myers, Palmer) – 3:31
"Love You Like a Woman" (Majors, Palmer) – 4:23
"I'm Not of the World" (Majors, Palmer, Shea) – 3:41

Chart performance

References
Allmusic (see infobox)

2007 debut albums
Rissi Palmer albums